Owen Vincent Coffin (June 20, 1836 – January 13, 1921) was an American politician and the 56th Governor of Connecticut from 1895 to 1897.

Biography
Coffin was born in Mansfield, New York. He studied at Cortland Academy and the Charlottesville Seminary. At seventeen he went to New York to be a salesman for a mercantile house, and two years later, in 1855, he became the New York representative of a prominent Connecticut manufacturing firm.

In 1858, he married Ellen Elizabeth Coe, and they had two children. When the American Civil War broke out in 1861, he was a strong supporter of the Union, but physically barred from active service. However, he served two terms as president of the Brooklyn YMCA and was active in the New York Committee of the United States Christian Commission.

Career
In 1864, Coffin moved to Connecticut. He was president of the Middlesex Mutual (Fire) Assurance Company from 1865 to 1878. He was secretary and treasurer of the Farmers and Mechanics Savings Bank of Middletown,  and he held the same offices and that of director for several years in the old Air Line Railroad Company. From 1872 to 1874 he was mayor of Middletown. In 1875, he was president of the Middlesex County Agricultural Society. A member of the Connecticut Senate for the 22nd District, he served in 1887 and also in 1889.  In 1894 he became a member of the Connecticut Society of the Sons of the American Revolution.

Governor of Connecticut
In 1894 Coffin was nominated for governor and elected by the greatest majority recorded up to that time. During his term, a legislation was passed that prohibited the use of convict labor in the production of food, drugs, and tobacco products. Several other changes also took place. A state board of mediation and arbitration was instituted, and a bill was enacted that disallowed children under the age of 14 from working, and a bill was constituted that enabled a worker's right to join a labor union.

Coffin left office on January 6, 1897, but stayed active in his business ventures, and in his civic and religious dealings. He received the honorary degree of LL.D. from Wesleyan University and is an honorary member of the college fraternity Delta Kappa Epsilon.

Death
Coffin enjoyed shooting and fishing, and for years he was president of the Middletown Rifle Association as well as the vice-president of the Connecticut Rifle Association. He died on January 13, 1921, and is interred at Indian Hill Cemetery, Middletown, Connecticut.

References

External links
 Sobel, Robert and John Raimo. Biographical Directory of the Governors of the United States, 1789-1978. Greenwood Press, 1988. 

The Political Graveyard
Geni.com
National Governors Association

1836 births
1921 deaths
Burials at Indian Hill Cemetery
Mayors of Middletown, Connecticut
Republican Party Connecticut state senators
Republican Party governors of Connecticut
American Congregationalists